Sarah Grace Stiles (born June 20, 1979) is an American singer and actress known for her work in Off-Broadway and Broadway theatre.

She performed the role of Kate Monster/Lucy the Slut in Avenue Q, and performed in the musical Vanities, in which she played the character of Joanne. She was nominated for the Tony Award for Best Featured Actress in a Play in 2015 for her performance in Hand to God and the Tony Award for Best Featured Actress in a Musical in 2019 for her performance in Tootsie. She also voiced Spinel in Steven Universe: The Movie (2019), and Steven Universe Future (2020). She can also be heard as diva Emma Olivia in As the Curtain Rises, an original Broadway soap opera from the Broadway Podcast Network.

Early life
Stiles was born on June 20, 1979 in Massachusetts and was later raised in Strafford, New Hampshire attending Strafford Elementary School. After middle school, Stiles began her high school career at Coe-Brown Northwood Academy in New Hampshire.

Career
At the age of 12, Stiles started getting involved with theater productions in Portsmouth, New Hampshire. Her first role was the titular character in Annie at the Seacoast Repertory Theater. As a teenager, Stiles played two other major roles while living in New Hampshire: Dorothy in The Wizard of Oz, and Cinderella in Cinderella. Stiles loved the performing arts so much that she spent her summers working at the Prescott Park Arts Festival in Portsmouth.

Before she got involved with Broadway productions, she trained at the American Musical and Dramatic Academy in New York City. Stiles is known for her two roles in the Off-Broadway production Avenue Q,the story of a college student who moves to New York City with big dreams but lives on Avenue Q and has very little money. Stiles plays Kate Monster and Lucy the Slut, who are two puppets that she controls throughout the show.

After Stiles spent much of her time in the production of Avenue Q, she later was offered the role of Joanne in Vanities, a project that Stiles had been involved with for two years. Vanities was performed at the Pasadena Playhouse in Pasadena, California, but eventually moved to Second Stage in New York. This role in Vanities eventually led Stiles to be involved in recording an album for the songs.

She played the role of Little Red Riding Hood in Stephen Sondheim and James Lapine's musical Into the Woods at the Delacorte Theater in New York as part of Shakespeare in the Park. She starred opposite Academy Award nominee Amy Adams and Tony Award winners Donna Murphy and Denis O'Hare.

In 2017, Stiles appeared in the Epix television series Get Shorty. Stiles also appeared in the 2018 film Unsane. Additionally in 2018, Stiles was cast in the recurring role of Axe Capital stock trader Bonnie Barella on the Showtime series Billions (season 3–present).

She appeared in the stage musical version of the film Tootsie beginning in September 2018, which ran at the Cadillac Palace Theatre in Chicago from Sept. 11 to Oct. 14, 2018. The musical opened on Broadway in April 2019. In the third season of the Epix television series Get Shorty, Stiles' character, Gladys Parrish, a singer/actress, is cast in the Broadway musical Tootsie playing the character Stiles actually played in the musical. This plot development allowed Stiles to recreate one of her numbers from the Broadway show on the TV series.

Personal life
Stiles married her husband, Jeff, on October 18, 2020. They live in New York City with their dog, Patti.

Discography
Along with having performed on many different stages in various off-Broadway shows, Stiles has found the time to be involved in three different albums for three plays. Her first album recording was singing for the role of Joanne, for the musical, Vanities the Musical. Her second album recording was when she sang the character Nazirah for the musical, The Road to Qatar. Most recently, she can be heard on the album for the musical adaptation of Roald Dahl's James and the Giant Peach as the Spider. In 2016, she teamed up with Gary Lucas to record Gary Lucas' Fleischerei: Music from Max Fleischer Cartoons. In 2020, she released her first EP, You Can Ukulele With Me. On that album, Stiles shows her skill at playing the ukulele, an instrument she has been known to play: in one episode of Get Shorty, Stiles played the ukulele for two songs (one of which, "Simple Song of Love (The La La Song)", was performed for her show Squirrel Heart, and would show up in re-recorded form as the lead-off track from You Can Ukulele With Me); and she played it in the aforementioned Squirrel Heart show.

Aside from album recordings, Stiles and her friend Howie have been working on their sketches for their comedy channel on YouTube. The YouTube channel is called Sillyocity, and together, the two of them combine their ideas to make short comedic webisodes.

Theatre credits

Filmography

Film

Television

Awards and nominations

References

External links
 
 
 

1979 births
American musical theatre actresses
American women singers
21st-century American actresses
Living people
Actresses from Massachusetts
Singers from Massachusetts
Actresses from New Hampshire
Singers from New Hampshire
American stage actresses
People from Strafford, New Hampshire
American ukulele players